Seabreeze High School is a public high school located in Daytona Beach, Florida, United States. The school was named a Blue Ribbon School of Excellence in 1989.

Notable alumni
 Duane and Gregg Allman, of The Allman Brothers Band, class of 1965 (Gregg) (Duane was a school dropout)
 Bill France Jr., president of NASCAR from 1972 to 2000, class of 1951
 Jim France, NASCAR and International Speedway Corporation executive, class of 1963
 Larry Gagner, artist and former college and professional football player, class of 1962
 Kerry Healey, lieutenant governor of Massachusetts from 2003 to 2007, class of 1978
 Shere Hite, sexologist, class of 1960
 J. R. House, professional baseball player
 Sebastian Janikowski, former Oakland Raiders kicker, NFL record holder for most 50+ yard field goals, class of 1997
 Brian Kelley, part of the country music duo, Florida Georgia Line
 Walter McCoy, track athlete, 1984 Olympic gold medalist
 Dee Mewbourne, deputy commander, United States Transportation Command
 Allison Miner, class of 1967, co-founder New Orleans Jazz & Heritage Festival
 Jane Morgan, singer during the 1950s and 1960s
 Steve J. Palmer, actor and producer, known for portraying Bill Williamson in Red Dead Redemption and Red Dead Redemption 2
 Hal Prewitt, artist, photographer, entrepreneur, racecar driver and inventor of computer technology and early pioneer in the personal computer revolution, class of 1972
 Marie Ragghianti (real-life character played by Sissy Spacek in the film Marie), class of 1960
Corey Walden, professional basketball player, 2019 Israeli Basketball Premier League MVP
 Eric Weems, wide receiver and Pro Bowl kickoff/punt returner for the Atlanta Falcons (NFL), class of 2003

References

External links

 Official Website

High schools in Volusia County, Florida
Public high schools in Florida
Buildings and structures in Daytona Beach, Florida
Educational institutions established in 1908
1908 establishments in Florida